This article contains a list of the housing developments built by Levitt & Sons on Long Island, in the State of New York.

Description

Background 
During the 20th century, Long Island (and the US as a whole) saw a pattern of mass suburbanization. Levitt and Sons – one of the most famous real estate firms of the 20th century – built many housing developments across Long Island (and the USA, as a whole), including Levittown, New York – which is widely-considered as being America's first mass-produced suburb, and also as the community which set the standards in post-war neighborhood designs.

Controversial discriminatory housing practices 
Levitt & Sons was the center of much controversy over the decades for its discriminatory and segregational housing practices. They refused to sell to People of Color and preferred not to sell to people of the Jewish faith (despite the fact that the Levitts were themselves Jewish), as, at the time, the Federal Housing Administration still allowed these policies in public housing developments, at the developer's discretion, with reasoning. The FHA even discouraged developers from selling to non-Whites by refusing to offer mortgages to communities that were racially integrated.

List of Long Island Levitt and Sons communities

See also 

 Levitt & Sons – the main article for the firm which built these developments
 Levittown, New York – the main article for Levittown (also known as Island Trees/Jerusalem), New York
 Levittown – the seven Levitt developments known as (or formerly known as) "Levittown"

References

External links 

 http://levittownbeyond.com/index.html (Levittown Beyond; a website that details the history of the firm and their many housing developments)
 Levitt Communities Map (a map made by Levittown Beyond of Levitt developments and significant community features, such as their model homes, on Long Island and across the world)

Levittown
Lists of populated places in New York (state)